Ethiopian national under-17 football team, also known as Ethiopia Under-17 or Ethiopia U17 (Amharic:ከ 17 ዓመት በታች የወንዶች እግር ኳስ ብሔራዊ ቡድን), represents Ethiopia in association football at an under-17 age level and is controlled by Ethiopian Football Federation, the governing body for football in Ethiopia. The current coach is Temesgen Dana

Players

Current squad

References

 http://www.cafonline.com/en-us/competitions/afconu172019q-cecafazone/MatchDetails?MatchId=Zi7yNXuGOc9Z4mF%2bbaE4z%2blL2bg7kvFiDudJUQSLqo%2bTMYf6v2BXrNon5uyHtVOF

Under-17
African national under-17 association football teams
Football in Ethiopia
Youth in Ethiopia